Leo Rosschou (24 December 1928 – 13 December 2022) was a Danish racewalker. He competed in the men's 20 kilometres walk at the 1960 Summer Olympics.

References

External links
 

1928 births
2022 deaths
Athletes (track and field) at the 1960 Summer Olympics
Danish male racewalkers
Olympic athletes of Denmark
Sportspeople from Frederiksberg